Daria Ryzhkova (8 February 1995) is a Russian water polo player.

She competed  for the Russian national team at the 2014 Women's European Water Polo Championship, and 2017 World Aquatics Championships

See also
 List of World Aquatics Championships medalists in water polo

References

External links
 
 Daria Ryzhkova

Russian female water polo players
1995 births
World Aquatics Championships medalists in water polo
Living people
21st-century Russian women